The 2015 Gedling Borough Council election was held on 7 May 2015 to elect all members of Gedling Borough Council in Nottinghamshire, England as part of the English local elections coinciding with the 2015 General Election. Each councillor serves a four-year term of office.

Following Boundary Commission recommendations boundary change took place for this election to provide for 19 wards, many of which are two or three-member, thus electing 41 councillors.

Results

Summary of Results
Labour Party candidates won a majority, exceeding the 21 member threshold needed to reach majority party status, formerly having 64% of councillors.  The Conservative group was formerly the opposition party on the council, holding 15 seats out of 50 on the larger council between 2011 and 2015.  The remainder of councillors comprised Liberal Democrat members, formerly holding 3 seats on the council from 2011 to 2015, returned 1 of the council's 41 councillors.

Ward Results

Bestwood St Albans

Calverton

Carlton

Carlton Hill

Cavendish

Colwick

Coppice

Daybrook

Dumbles

Ernehale

Gedling

Netherfield

Newstead Abbey

Phoenix

Plains

Porchester

Redhill

Trent Valley

Woodthorpe

References

2015
2015 English local elections
May 2015 events in the United Kingdom
2010s in Nottinghamshire